Allium macleanii is an Asian species of wild onion found at high elevations in Pakistan, Kazakhstan, Turkmenistan, Kyrgyzstan, Afghanistan, Nepal, Tajikistan, and northern India. It is a perennial herb up to 100 cm tall, with a spherical umbel up to 7 cm in diameter. The umbel is crowded with many purple flowers.

References

External links
 

macleanii
Onions
Flora of temperate Asia
Plants described in 1883
Flora of the Indian subcontinent
Taxa named by John Gilbert Baker